Primavera-Interlagos is a train station on ViaMobilidade Line 9-Emerald, in the district of Cidade Dutra in São Paulo. The station was built by CPTM to attend the regions of Jardim Primavera and Interlagos.

See also
 Cidade Dutra
 Line 9 (CPTM)
 Subprefecture of Capela do Socorro
 Roman Catholic Diocese of Santo Amaro
 Interlagos Racetrack

References

External links
 Official page of the Paulista Metropolitan Trains Company
 Subprefecture of Capela do Socorro
 Roman Catholic Diocese of Santo Amaro
 Interlagos Racetrack

Railway stations opened in 2008